Passé le Rio Grande (Passed the Rio Grande) is the sixth studio album by French rocker Alain Bashung, issued in 1986 on Philips Records.

Production 
After the commercial failures of the albums Play blessures in 1982 and Figure imposée in 1983, Bashung experienced success a new with the single "S.O.S. Amor" in 1984. The single helped him to give his career a new start.

In the wake of this success, he published this album, co-written by Boris Bergman, who was the main lyricist for his first three albums. The album features the singles "Malédiction" ("Curse") which was quite successful as well, and "L'Arrivée du tour" ("The Arrival of the tour").

Reception

Critical reception 
Passé le Rio Grande was awarded the Best rock album of the year award at the Victoires de la musique awards in 1986, the first for Bashung.

Track listing

Bonus Track (1992 CD reissue)

Bonus Tracks (subsequent CD reissues)

Personnel
Alain Bashung - vocals, harmonica, bells
Johnny Turnbull, Les Davidson, Olivier Guindon - guitar
Norman Watt-Roy - bass
Vic Emerson - keyboards
Philippe Draï - drums
The Flying Pickets - backing vocals
Gary Barnacle - saxophone (uncredited)

1986 albums
Barclay (record label) albums
Alain Bashung albums